Ernest Dominic Capers (born August 7, 1950) is an American football coach who is a senior defensive assistant for the Carolina Panthers of the National Football League (NFL). He was previously the inaugural head coach of the Carolina Panthers and the Houston Texans for four seasons each. Capers is the only head coach to lead two different NFL expansion teams during their first seasons.

A defensive assistant for most of his coaching career, Capers held his first defensive coordinator position with the Pittsburgh Steelers in 1992. He left Pittsburgh to become the Panthers head coach in 1995, where he guided the team to a 7–9 record, the best finish for an NFL expansion franchise in their inaugural season. The following year, Capers led the Panthers to a division title and the NFC Championship Game, making them the youngest NFL expansion franchise to clinch their division and (along with the Jacksonville Jaguars) appear in a conference championship.

Capers' early success with Carolina would result in him becoming the inaugural head coach of the Texans in 2002, although he was unable to lead them to a winning record or playoff berth. He continued to hold assistant coaching positions afterwards, most prominently as the defensive coordinator of the Green Bay Packers from 2009 to 2017, with whom he helped win a Super Bowl title in Super Bowl XLV.

Early years
After playing high school football for the Meadowbrook Colts in Byesville, Ohio, Capers attended Mount Union College in Alliance, Ohio where he played linebacker and defensive tackle. He is a brother of the Alpha Nu chapter of Alpha Tau Omega fraternity.

Coaching career

College
He began his coaching career as a graduate assistant at Kent State University and the University of Washington.  Later he was an assistant coach at Hawaii, San Jose State, University of California, Berkeley, Tennessee, and Ohio State.

Professional
After a stint in the USFL, he began his NFL career as an assistant with the New Orleans Saints and was named defensive coordinator of the Pittsburgh Steelers in 1992, including a trip to the AFC Championship game in 1994. He remained with the Steelers until becoming head coach of the expansion Carolina Panthers in 1995. After 1995's 7–9 season, a record breaking mark for an expansion team, the Panthers posted a 12–4 record in 1996 and advanced to the NFC Championship game, where they were defeated by the eventual Super Bowl XXXI champion Green Bay Packers. This would end up being Capers' only winning season as a head coach, as well as the only season in which his team qualified for the playoffs. Continuing to spend against the salary cap, and eventually taking control of personnel matters in 1997, the Panthers went 7–9, followed by a 4–12 season in 1998, at the end of which he was terminated.

After being let go from the Panthers, he served as the defensive coordinator with the Jacksonville Jaguars until becoming the head coach of the expansion Houston Texans on January 21, 2001. After starting out 4–12 (2002) and 5–11 (2003) in his first two seasons in Houston, the Texans posted a 7–9 mark in 2004. However, the Texans dropped to a record of 2–14 in 2005 and Capers was fired.

On January 23, 2006, the Miami Dolphins announced the hiring of Dom Capers as the team's defensive coordinator. There, he served as assistant head coach. With an annual salary of $2.6 million, Capers was the highest paid assistant coach in the NFL, alongside Washington Redskins assistant head coach Gregg Williams. On Thursday, January 3, 2008, Dom Capers was fired along with all offensive and defensive coaches.

On January 29, 2008, Capers interviewed with the Dallas Cowboys for the vacant linebackers coach position. It is rumored that he was offered the defensive coordinator or defensive consultant position.

On February 21, 2008, Capers was hired by the Patriots as their secondary coach/special assistant, replacing Joel Collier.

On January 19, 2009, Capers was named the Green Bay Packers defensive coordinator by head coach Mike McCarthy and general manager Ted Thompson, where he replaced the 4-3 defense Green Bay had used since 1992 with the 3–4 he used in Miami.  Green Bay's defensive ranking in his first year improved to second in the league in 2009, from 21st in the league in 2008.

Between September 12, 2010 and January 2011, Capers' defense finished the regular season ranked 2nd in scoring defense, 5th in total defense, 2nd in interceptions, 2nd in sacks, and 1st in opposing quarterback passer rating, in spite of being decimated by injuries during the 2010 season. On February 6, 2011, Capers led a 5th ranked defensive squad and helped the Packers win the Super Bowl.  During the playoff run his team had a pick 6 in the final 3 playoff games that year; Divisional Round (Williams), Championship game (Raji), and in Super Bowl XLV (Collins).

On January 1, 2018, he was fired as the defensive coordinator of the Green Bay Packers by head coach Mike McCarthy.

On February 19, 2019, the Jacksonville Jaguars announced that Capers will join their coaching staff as a senior defensive assistant. After one season in Jacksonville, he joined the Minnesota Vikings on February 10, 2020, in the same capacity. His contract with the Vikings was not renewed after the season.

On January 29, 2021, the Detroit Lions announced that Capers will join their coaching staff as a senior defensive assistant.

On February 11, 2022, Capers was hired by the Denver Broncos to serve as a senior defensive assistant for the 2022 season. Following a year-long stint with the Broncos, Capers returned to the Carolina Panthers to serve as a senior defensive assistant under newly hired head coach Frank Reich.

Head coaching record

References

1950 births
Living people
American football linebackers
California Golden Bears football coaches
Carolina Panthers head coaches
Green Bay Packers coaches
Hawaii Rainbow Warriors football coaches
Houston Texans head coaches
Jacksonville Jaguars coaches
Kent State Golden Flashes football coaches
Miami Dolphins coaches
Minnesota Vikings coaches
New England Patriots coaches
Mount Union Purple Raiders football players
New Orleans Saints coaches
Ohio State Buckeyes football coaches
Pittsburgh Steelers coaches
San Jose State Spartans football coaches
Tennessee Volunteers football coaches
Washington Huskies football coaches
National Football League defensive coordinators
People from Cambridge, Ohio
Players of American football from Ohio
Denver Broncos coaches
Carolina Panthers coaches